Fintan McCarthy (born 23 November 1996) is an Irish lightweight rower. He is an Irish national champion and a world and Olympic champion. He won the men's lightweight double sculls championship title with Paul O'Donovan at the 2019 World Rowing Championships and at the 2020 Tokyo Olympics where he set a new world's best time for that event. He also won a bronze medal in lightweight single sculls at the 2020 European Rowing Championships.

Career
McCarthy is from Skibbereen, County Cork. He experienced in rowing while in primary school, but only started taking the sport seriously when he was 15 after seeing the London Olympics in 2012.  He studied at University College Cork and graduated with a degree in physiology.

McCarthy won his first national title in rowing with his brother Jake in 2016. The brothers qualified for the European Rowing Championships final in 2019.

In 2019, he was partnered with Paul O'Donovan in the men's lightweight double sculls at the World Rowing Championships held at Linz-Ottensheim in Austria, where they won the gold medal and the world championship title. In 2020, he won a bronze in the men's lightweight single sculls at the 2020 European Rowing Championships held in Poznan, Poland.

McCarthy raced with O'Donovan at the 2021 European Rowing Championships, where they won gold. The following month they won gold again at the World Rowing Cup II regatta in Lucerne. At the 2020 Tokyo Olympics, held in July 2021, the pair set a world's best time of 6:05:33 while winning their semifinal of the lightweight double sculls event. They went on to win the gold medal, finishing ahead of the German and Italian teams.

References

External links

Fintan McCarthy at Rowing Ireland

1996 births
Living people
Irish male rowers
World Rowing Championships medalists for Ireland
Rowers at the 2020 Summer Olympics
Medalists at the 2020 Summer Olympics
Olympic medalists in rowing
Olympic gold medalists for Ireland
21st-century Irish people